Unione Sportiva Vibonese Calcio is an Italian association football club located in Vibo Valentia, Calabria. It currently plays in Serie C.

History 
Vibonese was founded in 1928.

The club in the season 2011–12 was relegated from Lega Pro Seconda Divisione to Serie D after losing the final playout against Mantova. They returned to Serie C in 2018 under the tenure of former Serie A manager Nevio Orlandi.

Colors and badge 
Its colors are red and blue.

Current squad 
As of 1 September 2022

Out on loan

Famous players

References

External links 
Official site

Football clubs in Calabria
Association football clubs established in 1928
Serie C clubs
1928 establishments in Italy
Vibo Valentia